Televisión Pública Noticias (formerly called Visión 7) is an Argentine TV news program.

Awards

Nominations
 2013 Martín Fierro Awards
 Best female journalist (Gabriela Radice)
 Best male journalist (Pedro Brieger)

References

Television news in Argentina
Televisión Pública original programming
2010s Argentine television series